1040 is a documentary film about Christianity in the "10/40 Window". Directed by Evan Jackson Leong, the film is narrated by musician Jaeson Ma, who travels to several countries including China, South Korea, and Singapore. Ma describes the growth of Christianity in Asia as one of the greatest Christian Revivals in history.

References

External links
 
 

2010s English-language films
2010 films
American documentary films
2010 documentary films
Films about evangelicalism
Christianity in Asia
2010s American films